Nikolai Dmitriyevich Kuznetsov (2 December 1850 – 2 March 1929) was a Russian painter and art professor at the St. Petersburg Imperial Academy of Arts. His work consists primarily of portraits and genre scenes.

Biography 

He was the son of a wealthy landowner and began school in Odessa, where his artistic talent was discovered and he began taking lessons at the local drawing school. From 1876 to 1880, he attended the Imperial Academy of Arts, where he studied with Pavel Chistyakov. He was considered to be a good student, but often left the academy to paint at the family estate. At this time, he successfully defied his family's wishes and married a working-class woman who was employed there.

Following graduation, he was a frequent exhibitor throughout Russia and Ukraine and received numerous commissions. Among his portrait sitters were Peter Tchaikovsky and Élie Metchnikoff. During this time, he was a frequent visitor to the Abramtsevo Colony. Because of his large, wrestler's physique, he often served as a model for other painters.

After an accident in 1889, he had to walk on crutches, so he worked entirely in a studio at his estate, which became a meeting place for the creative community, including figures such as Fyodor Chaliapin, in addition to artists. In 1893, somewhat recovered, he moved his studio to Odessa and began exhibiting. Two years later, he was offered a professorship at the Imperial Academy, where he taught battle painting, but left in 1897 to return to Odessa. In 1900, he became an Academician and a member of the Peredvizhniki. That same year, he exhibited at the Exposition Universelle in Paris. Later, he travelled extensively to exhibitions throughout Europe.

In 1920, during the Russian Civil War, as the White Army retreated, he and his family emigrated to Yugoslavia, eventually settling in Sarajevo, where he died in 1929.

His daughter was the opera singer Maria Nikolaevna Kuznetsova.

Selected portraits

Selected paintings

References

External links 

1850 births
1930 deaths
People from Odesa Oblast
People from Odessky Uyezd
Peredvizhniki
19th-century Ukrainian painters
19th-century Ukrainian male artists
Ukrainian male painters
19th-century male artists from the Russian Empire
20th-century Ukrainian painters
20th-century Ukrainian male artists